Bochenek is a Polish surname meaning loaf (of bread). It is most frequent in southern Poland. The surname may refer to:
 Dominik Bochenek (born 1987), Polish athlete
 Grace Bochenek, American industrial engineer
 Jan Bochenek (1931-2011), Polish weightlifter
 Krystyna Bochenek (1953-2010), Polish politician
 Mateusz Bochenek (born 1993), Polish politician

References 

Polish-language surnames